Several Canadian naval units have been named HMCS Acadia.

  is Canada's most historic oceanographic and hydrographic survey and research vessel.  She was commissioned into naval service as HMCS Acadia (I) during both the First and Second World Wars, while serving with her civilian name before and after each conflict. She is currently a museum ship docked during the summer months at the Maritime Museum of the Atlantic in Halifax, Nova Scotia. Acadia is the name the French Colonials gave to Nova Scotia prior to British Rule.
 CSTC HMCS Acadia (II) is a cadet summer training centre operated by the Royal Canadian Sea Cadets that has used the unit name Acadia from 1956–present.  It is currently located at Cornwallis, Nova Scotia.

References

Royal Canadian Navy ship names